Benedetto Pola (15 April 1915 – 1 August 2000) was an Italian cyclist. He competed in the sprint and the time trial events at the 1936 Summer Olympics.

References

External links
 

1915 births
2000 deaths
Italian male cyclists
Olympic cyclists of Italy
Cyclists at the 1936 Summer Olympics
Cyclists from the Province of Brescia
People from Borgosatollo